(Swedish:
Finska pinnar), (Norwegian: Finske pinner), (Danish: Finsk brød) or Finnish sticks are a Scandinavian shortbread cookie characterized by its long shape, crispy texture, and its frequent consumption during Christmas. It's also frequently featured in sju sorters kakor, a Scandinavian tradition of preparing seven different kinds of cookies for guests. Contrary to what the name implies, it's not thought to be of Finnish origin, and it's uncertain how this cookie received its name.

See also 
 List of Norwegian desserts
 Norwegian cuisine

References 

Norwegian cuisine
Cakes